Halenahalli is a village in the southern state of Karnataka, India. It is located in the Nelamangala taluk of Bangalore Rural district.

Demographics 
Halenahalli had population of 864 of which 443 are males while 421 are females as per report released by Census India 2011.

Geography 
The total geographical area of village is 284.36 hectares.

Bus route from Bengaluru City 
Yeshwantapura - Darasahalli - Nelamangala

See also 

 Districts of Karnataka

References

External links 

 https://bangalorerural.nic.in/en/

Villages in Bangalore Rural district